The Zoo de Doué (formally Bioparc de Doué-la-Fontaine) is a  zoo that opened in 1961 in Doué-la-Fontaine, Maine-et-Loire, France.

The zoo is home to some 1000 animals representing about 100 species, and is a member of the European Association of Zoos and Aquaria (EAZA) and the World Association of Zoos and Aquariums (WAZA).

External links

Zoos in France
Buildings and structures in Maine-et-Loire
Tourist attractions in Maine-et-Loire
Zoos established in 1986
Organizations based in Pays de la Loire